"Hunter" is a song by British singer Dido from her debut album, No Angel (1999). The song was released as the third single from the album in the United States on 18 June 2001. "Hunter" reached number 17 on the UK Singles Chart and peaked within the top 50 in Australia, France, Greece, Ireland, and New Zealand. In the US, it entered the top 20 on two Billboard charts.

Music video
The video, directed by Matthew Rolston, takes place in the city during a night of the full moon. In the video, Dido is chasing her doppelgänger in the city. Intercut are scenes of Dido singing the song in a balcony, living room and also the underwater amusement park. The video ends with Dido catching up with her lookalike in a tunnel and both hugging and embracing each other.

Track listings

UK CD1
 "Hunter" – 3:54
 "Hunter" (MJ Cole remix) – 6:07
 "Take My Hand" (Rollo & Sister Bliss remix) – 8:03

UK CD2
 "Hunter" – 3:54
 "Hunter" (FK-EK vocal mix) – 7:04
 "Take My Hand" (Brothers in Rhythm remix) – 8:50

UK 12-inch single
A. "Hunter" (MJ Cole remix) – 6:07
B. "Take My Hand" (Rollo & Sister Bliss remix) – 8:03

Australian CD single
 "Hunter" – 3:56
 "Hunter" (FK-EK vocal mix) – 7:04
 "Take My Hand" (Rollo & Sister Bliss remix) – 8:03

Personnel
Personnel are lifted from the UK CD1 liner notes.

 Dido – writing (as Dido Armstrong), vocals, production
 Rollo Armstrong – writing
 Pauline Taylor – additional background vocals
 Rick Nowels – keyboards, acoustic guitar, Wurlitzer, Chamberlin, production
 John Themis – electric guitar, percussion
 Rusty Anderson – electric guitar
 John Pierce – bass

 Richie Stevens – additional live drums
 Ash Howes – recording, mixing
 Randy Wine – additional recording
 James Sanger – programming
 Richard Andrews – artwork design
 Ellen von Unwerth – photography

Charts

Release history

References

1999 songs
2001 singles
Arista Records singles
Bertelsmann Music Group singles
Cheeky Records singles
Dido (singer) songs
Music videos directed by Matthew Rolston
Song recordings produced by Dido (singer)
Song recordings produced by Rick Nowels
Songs written by Dido (singer)
Songs written by Rollo Armstrong